Keith Jellum is an American artist based in Portland, Oregon.

Works
 Mimir (1980)
 Electronic Poet (1984)
 Transcendence

References

Date of birth missing (living people)
Living people
Artists from Portland, Oregon
Year of birth missing (living people)
American sculptors